Al-Jamiatul Ahlia Darul Ulum Moinul Islam popularly known as Hathazari Madrasa is the oldest and largest madrasa in Bangladesh. The following is a list of notable alumni.

See more
 List of Darul Uloom Deoband alumni
 List of Mazahir Uloom alumni

References

Bibliography

 

Darul Uloom Hathazari
Sunni Muslim scholars of Islam
Deobandi-related lists